The fan-tailed grassbird or broad-tailed warbler (Catriscus brevirostris) is an African species of Old World warbler in the family Locustellidae. The species is closely related to the broad-tailed grassbird of India, and is sometimes treated as the same species, although a 2018 study found that it and the broad-tailed grassbird were not closely related, with the Indian species being a sister of Chaetornis striata.

The species has a discontinuous distribution across Africa, and is found in Angola, Burundi, Cameroon, Republic of the Congo, Democratic Republic of the Congo, Eswatini, Equatorial Guinea, Ethiopia, Gabon, Guinea, Kenya, Malawi, Mozambique, Nigeria, Rwanda, Sierra Leone, South Africa, South Sudan, Tanzania, Uganda, Zambia, and Zimbabwe.

Gallery

References

External links
 Fan-tailed grassbird - Species text in The Atlas of Southern African Birds.

fan-tailed grassbird
Birds of Sub-Saharan Africa
fan-tailed grassbird
Taxonomy articles created by Polbot
Taxobox binomials not recognized by IUCN